Evan John Llewelyn (30 June 1875 – 11 June 1967) was an Australian politician. He was the Labor member for Toowoomba in the Legislative Assembly of Queensland from 1925 to 1929 and from 1932 to 1935. He was the son of Henry Llewellyn, who was a member of the Queensland Legislative Council from 1917 to 1922.

After leaving school he worked in his father's Gympie newsagency, at South Bingera sugar mill and at the Queensland Meat Export Company in Pinkenba. In 1901 he joined the Citizens Forces as an ambulance bearer and later that year joined the Queensland Ambulance Service Transport Brigade in Brisbane. In 1906 he was appointed Senior Bearer at Ipswich and was superintendent of the Toowoomba ambulance centre from 1907 until 1925. After leaving politics he again became superintendent of the Toowoomba ambulance centre from 1935 until 1954.

References

1875 births
1967 deaths
Members of the Queensland Legislative Assembly
Place of birth missing
People from Toowoomba
Australian Labor Party members of the Parliament of Queensland